Michael Giolbas (born 26 June 1970) is a Danish former football midfielder, who most prominently won the Danish championship with F.C. Copenhagen in 1993.

Giolbas started his professional career with B 1903, moving to F.C. Copenhagen upon its founding in 1992. After an intermezzo with Herfølge BK, Giolbas moved to minnows BK Frem, where he was soon elected captain, in 1997.

External links
 Boldklubben Frem profile
 Nipserstat profile

1970 births
Living people
Danish men's footballers
F.C. Copenhagen players
Herfølge Boldklub players
Boldklubben Frem players
KFUM Roskilde players
Association football midfielders